Henk Vonk (7 April 1942 – 17 June 2019) was a Dutch footballer who played for DOS and Gooiland, and later spent 30 years at FC Utrecht as a scout and coach, as well as two spells as caretaker manager.

References

1942 births
2019 deaths
Dutch footballers
VV DOS players
SC 't Gooi players
Dutch football managers
FC Utrecht managers
FC Utrecht non-playing staff
Association footballers not categorized by position